Hymenophyllum falklandicum, the Falklands filmy fern, is a plant in the fern family Hymenophyllaceae. It is native to southern South America and some subantarctic islands.

Description
The fronds are dark green, glabrous and serrated. Spores are contained in brown or black capsules.

Distribution and habitat
Hymenophyllum falklandicum is native to Patagonia, the Juan Fernández Islands, the Falkland Islands, South Georgia and Macquarie Island.

References

falklandicum
Flora of southern Chile
Flora of South Argentina
Flora of the Juan Fernández Islands
Flora of the Falkland Islands
Flora of Macquarie Island
Flora of South Georgia Island
Plants described in 1867
Taxa named by John Gilbert Baker